Elvira and the Party Monsters is a 1989 pinball game designed by Dennis Nordman and Jim Patla and released by Midway (under the Bally label), featuring horrorshow-hostess Elvira. It was followed 1996 by Scared Stiff, also designed by Nordman.

Description
The marketing slogan "Elvira is No Cheap Date!" referring to the new .50/.75/1.00 pricing scheme. Elvira and the Party Monsters was made shortly after the merger of Williams and Bally. Although the game uses a vaguely Bally-style cabinet and flippers, all the rest of the game hardware are completely made up of Williams parts. The machine uses a System 11B CPU and associated board setup.

Digital version
Elvira and the Party Monsters was available as a licensed table of The Pinball Arcade for several platforms. A game cartridge called "Pinball Jam" was also produced for Atari Lynx, which includes two pinball games, Police Force and Elvira and the Party Monsters. This version of the table includes a scrolling 2D screen, a two-ball Multi-Ball, and more or less self-censored Elvira quotes.

References

External links

Elvira and the Party Monsters - robertwinter.com

1989 pinball machines
Bally pinball machines
Atari Lynx games